Division No. 4 is one of eighteen census divisions in the province of Saskatchewan, Canada, as defined by Statistics Canada. It is located in the southwest corner of the province, bordering Alberta to the west and Montana, United States to the south. The most populous community in this division is Maple Creek.

Demographics 

Census subdivisions 
The following census subdivisions (municipalities or municipal equivalents) are located within Saskatchewan's Division No. 4.

Towns

Eastend
Maple Creek
Shaunavon

Villages

 Bracken
 Cadillac
 Carmichael
 Climax
 Consul
 Frontier
 Neville
 Val Marie

Rural municipalities

 RM No. 17 Val Marie
 RM No. 18 Lone Tree 
 RM No. 19 Frontier
 RM No. 49 White Valley
 RM No. 51 Reno
 RM No. 77 Wise Creek
 RM No. 78 Grassy Creek
 RM No. 79 Arlington
 RM No. 107 Lac Pelletier
 RM No. 108 Bone Creek
 RM No. 109 Carmichael
 RM No. 110 Piapot
 RM No. 111 Maple Creek

Other communities

Special service areas

 Admiral

Organized hamlets

Darlings Beach

Hamlets

 Orkney
 Piapot
 Simmie

Unincorporated communities

Battle Creek
Beaver Valley
Belanger
Blumenort
Canuck
Carnagh
Claydon
Cross
Cummings
Divide
Dollard
East Fairwell
Edgell
Fort Walsh, National historic site
Garden Head
Govenlock
Hatton
Hillandale
Illerbrun
Instow
Kealey Springs
Klintonel
Lac Pelletier
Loomis
Masefield
Merryflat
Nashlyn
Neighbour
Neuhoffnung
Olga
Oxarat
Palisade
Rangeview
Ravenscrage
Robsart
Rosefield
Scotsguard
Senate
Sidewood
Skull Creek
South Fork
Staynor Hall
Vidora
West Plains
Willow Creek

Indian reserves
 Nekaneet Cree Nation
 Nekaneet Reserve
 Little Pine First Nation
 Little Pine 116
 Carry the Kettle Nakoda Nation
 Carry the Kettle 76-7
 Carry the Kettle 76-69
 Carry the Kettle 76-70
 Carry the Kettle 76-71
 Carry the Kettle 76-72
 Carry the Kettle 76-73
 Carry the Kettle 76-74
 Carry the Kettle 76-75
 Carry the Kettle 76-76
 Carry the Kettle 76-77
 Carry the Kettle 76-78
 Carry the Kettle 76-79
 Carry the Kettle 76-80
 Carry the Kettle 76-81
 Carry the Kettle 76-82
 Carry the Kettle 76-84

See also 
List of census divisions of Saskatchewan
List of communities in Saskatchewan

References

Division No. 4, Saskatchewan Statistics Canada

 
04